Yaroslav Halenko (born 7 January 1991) is a Ukrainian professional footballer who plays as a forward for LNZ Cherkasy.

Career 
Halenko is the product of the Youth Sportive School Chayka Kyiv and FC Obolon Kyiv's Youth Systems, and his first trainer was Oleh Tsaryuk.

Halenko's professional career continue, when he was promoted to FC Obolon-2 Kyiv in the Ukrainian Second League. And in 2010 he made his debut for the Ukrainian First League.

References

External links 
Profile at Official Site FFU (Ukr)

Ukrainian footballers
Ukrainian expatriate footballers
Ukraine student international footballers
Expatriate footballers in Georgia (country)
Ukrainian expatriate sportspeople in Georgia (country)
FC Zirka Kropyvnytskyi players
FC Nyva Ternopil players
FC Helios Kharkiv players
FC Hirnyk-Sport Horishni Plavni players
PFC Sumy players
FC Merani Martvili players
FC Bukovyna Chernivtsi players
FC Polissya Zhytomyr players
FC LNZ Cherkasy players
Association football forwards
1991 births
Living people
Footballers from Kyiv
Ukrainian Second League players